Claudia Mercedes Ortiz Menjívar (born 10 September 1987) is a Salvadoran politician who currently serves as a deputy of the Legislative Assembly. She is the only member of the political party Vamos in the legislature, being elected in the 2021 legislative election from the department of San Salvador.

Biography 

Claudia Mercedes Ortiz Menjívar was born on 10 September 1987 in San Salvador, El Salvador. She graduated from the Sacred Heart College and the Central American University as a lawyer.

In the 2021 legislative election, she was elected to the Legislative Assembly as a member of the Vamos political party, the only member of her party elected to the legislature. She declined to be a presidential candidate in the 2024 general election. In October 2022, she opposed a bill which would allow Salvadorans living outside of the country to vote in the 2024 election, claiming that it would lead to voter fraud. She is considered to be one of the leading figures of the political opposition within the legislature against the government of Nayib Bukele and Nuevas Ideas.

On 22 November 2022, she announced that she would be seeking reelection to the Legislative Assembly in 2024.

Ortiz is married and has two children. She is trilingual, being able to speak Spanish, French, and English.

References

External links 

 Legislative Assembly profile
 Official biography

1987 births
Living people
People from San Salvador Department
Salvadoran politicians